Sjaastad may refer to:

 Anders Christian Sjaastad (born 1942), politician
 Gustav Adolf Sjaastad (1902–1964), politician

See also
 Sjaastad syndrome or chronic paroxysmal hemicrania, a severe debilitating unilateral headache
 Sjåstad, village in Lier municipality, Norway